Achaeus is a genus of crabs comprising the following species:

Achaeus affinis Miers, 1884
Achaeus akanensis Sakai, 1937
Achaeus anauchen Buitendijk, 1939
Achaeus barnardi Griffin, 1968
Achaeus boninensis Miyake & Takeda, 1969
Achaeus brevidactylus Sakai, 1938
Achaeus brevifalcatus Rathbun, 1911
Achaeus brevirostris (Haswell, 1879)
Achaeus brevis (Ortmann, 1894)
Achaeus buderes Manning & Holthuis, 1981
Achaeus cadelli Alcock, 1896
Achaeus cranchii Leach, 1817
Achaeus curvirostris (A. Milne-Edwards, 1873)
Achaeus dubia Laurie, 1906
Achaeus erythraeus Balss, 1929
Achaeus foresti Monod, 1956
Achaeus gracilis (Costa, 1839)
Achaeus inimicus Rathbun, 1911
Achaeus japonicus (De Haan, 1839)
Achaeus kermadecensis Webber & Takeda, 2005
Achaeus lacertosus Stimpson, 1858
Achaeus laevioculis Miers, 1884
Achaeus lorina (Adams & White, 1848)
Achaeus monodi (Capart, 1951)
Achaeus paradicei Griffin, 1970
Achaeus podocheloides Griffin, 1970
Achaeus powelli Manning, 1982
Achaeus pugnax (De Man, 1928)
Achaeus robustus Yokoya, 1933
Achaeus serenei Griffin & Tranter, 1986
Achaeus spinosissimus Griffin, 1968
Achaeus spinossisimus Griffin, 1968
Achaeus spinosus Miers, 1879
Achaeus superciliaris (Ortmann, 1893)
Achaeus trifalcatus Forest & Guinot, 1966
Achaeus trituberculatus Rathbun, 1894
Achaeus tuberculatus Miers, 1879
Achaeus turbator Manning & Holthuis, 1981
Achaeus varians Takeda & Miyake, 1969
Achaeus villosus Rathbun, 1916

References

Majoidea